Maya Hungerbühler (born 25 March 1943) is a Swiss former swimmer. She competed in the women's 200 metre breaststroke at the 1960 Summer Olympics.

References

External links
 

1943 births
Living people
Olympic swimmers of Switzerland
Swimmers at the 1960 Summer Olympics
Sportspeople from Zürich
Swiss female breaststroke swimmers
20th-century Swiss women